Leslie Gordon "Les" Benjamin (April 29, 1925 – June 16, 2003) was a Canadian politician who served in the House of Commons of Canada. Benjamin was first elected to the House of Commons in 1968 as a New Democratic Party MP from Saskatchewan. In parliament, as the NDP's Transport critic, he often clashed with Otto Lang over the Crow Rate that allowed subsidized rail transport for prairie farmers and was an opponent of deregulation. He retired from parliament in 1993.

When Ronald Reagan addressed the Parliament of Canada in 1987, Benjamin heckled him by crying "he's mad!"

Benjamin was of Welsh heritage with his father's family coming to Canada from the Rumney Valley.

Prior to entering politics, Benjamin worked variously as a railway station agent, telegrapher and secretary.

References

External links
 

1925 births
2003 deaths
Canadian people of Welsh descent
Members of the House of Commons of Canada from Saskatchewan
New Democratic Party MPs
People from Medicine Hat
Politicians from Regina, Saskatchewan